Desert Thunder is a 1998 action film, It uses stock footage from Iron Eagle and Navy Seals.

Cast
 Daniel Baldwin as Lee Miller
 Tim Abell as Bobby "Jet" Burkett
 Richard Tyson as Ralph Streets

References

External links

Films directed by Jim Wynorski
1998 films
1990s English-language films
American action films
1990s American films